Still Phishin': A Bluegrass Tribute to Phish 2 is a bluegrass tribute album to the rock band Phish led by Alabama-based bluegrass collective Rollin' in the Hay. The songs' arrangements were constructed by bandleader Rick Carter. Unlike the previous Phish bluegrass tribute album Gone Phishin, this album features a number of rare songs, some of which (such as "Mike's Song") were never released on a Phish studio album.

Both volumes are available in a double disc set titled Forever Phishin': The Bluegrass Tribute to Phish.

Track listing
Mike's Song - 2:24
First Tube - 6:43
You Enjoy Myself - 6:01
Julius - 3:15
Maze - 8:05
Farmhouse - 3:38
Weekapaug Groove - 6:29
All Things Reconsidered - 3:57
Down With Disease - 4:25
Waste - 3:31

Personnel
Barry Waldrep: guitar, banjo, dobro, mandolin

Dennis Caplinger: guitar, banjo, mandolin, fiddle, bass

David West: guitar, banjo, mandolin, bass

Rick Carter: guitar, percussion

Gabe Witcher: fiddle

Tom Ball: harmonica

Stan Foster: bass

Randy Hunter: percussion

Lorenzo Martinez: percussion

2002 albums
Phish tribute albums